The Delaware and Hudson Railway (D&H)  is a railroad that operates in the Northeastern United States.  In 1991, after more than 150 years as an independent railroad, the D&H was purchased by the Canadian Pacific Railway (CP).  CP operates D&H under its subsidiary Soo Line Corporation which also operates Soo Line Railroad.

D&H's name originates from the 1823 New York state corporation charter listing "The President, Managers and Company of the Delaware & Hudson Canal Co." authorizing an establishment of "water communication" between the Delaware River and the Hudson River.

Nicknamed "The Bridge Line to New England and Canada," D&H connected New York with Montreal, Quebec and New England. D&H has also been known as "North America's oldest continually operated transportation company."

On September 19, 2015, the Norfolk Southern Railway completed acquisition of the D&H South Line from CP. The D&H South Line is 282 miles (454 kilometers) long and connects Schenectady, New York, to Sunbury, Pennsylvania. The D&H South Line consists of two rail lines, the Sunbury Line and the Freight Line. The Nicholson Cutoff is located on the Sunbury Line, which was a former mainline of the Delaware, Lackawanna and Western Railroad.

History 

By the 1790s, industrializing eastern population centers were having increasing troubles getting charcoal to fuel their growing kilns, smithies, and foundries. As local timber was denuded, efforts to find an alternative energy source began. During a fuel shortage in Philadelphia during the War of 1812, an employee at the direction of industrialist Josiah White conducted a series of experiments and discovered a number of ways that 'rock coal' or anthracite could be successfully ignited and burned. The fuel, theretofore, had been seen more as a way to put out a fire than a fuel to build one up, so its use also had to overcome  prejudice. White and his partner Erskine Hazard founded the Lehigh Coal and Navigation Company, creating the Lehigh Canal, and inspiring the exploitation of the anthracite deposits found by William Wurts around Carbondale, Pennsylvania, which led to the development of Scranton. The mills of White and Hazard, and the regular large boatloads they proved they could supply, had tipped the prejudice against anthracite to a wary plausibility in Philadelphia by 1822–1824 when the Lehigh was much damaged by flooding. The news of its rapid repair and restoration together with the fact anthracite stocks had for a time run down, but not out, establishing the reliable sourcing finished off the bias, as did the beginning of mine output reaching the Delaware basin markets due to the long delayed completion of the Schuylkill Canal.

Wurts was a large thinker, and inspired his brothers to back forming a company to deliver the new  fuel, anthracite, to New York City by building an ambitious canal to connect the Hudson River and the Delaware River, and both to the Coaldale coal deposits by chartering a Pennsylvania subsidiary corporation, the Delaware and Hudson Gravity Railroad, to bring coal to the Delaware and the new canal. This cable railroad would grow in importance and become the far-flung class I railroad, the Delaware and Hudson Railway.

Delaware and Hudson Canal Company
 

In the early 1820s, Philadelphia merchant William Wurts, who enjoyed walking about along Amerindian paths, and what today what is termed taking nature hikes, had heard of possible anthracite in the area, so took a trip to explore the sparsely settled regions of Northeastern Pennsylvania. Finding coal outcrops, he immediately realized the value of the extensive anthracite deposits.
 
Returning to Philadelphia, he successfully interested his brothers in backing the idea of building a canal to make easier transporting coal to New York City, which was still feeling the effects of the depletion of stands of woodlands providing heating and cooking firewood and also squeezed by continuing post-War of 1812 import restrictions on British bituminous coal, on which it had once been relying. The canal he proposed (the first sections of the Erie Canal, opened in 1821, creating news coverage) would also tie the developing industries along the Delaware to the Hudson, which helped raise financing.
 
At the time, nearly all the eastern cities were experiencing energy cost increases and difficulty in getting large quantities of fuel, as most nearby timber stands had been used up, often for charcoal production enabling foundries to start up, which now needed fuel to stay in business. This general condition around most long established cities and towns in the United States is one reason so much venture capital was raised for coal and coal transportation projects after 1823 and into the early 1840s, once Lehigh Coal & Navigation Company had blazed a way forward steadily increasing annual shipping to over a remarkable  by 1825.

The Delaware and Hudson Canal Company originates from the 1823 New York corporation charter listing the unusual name of "The President, Managers and Company of the Delaware & Hudson Canal Co." authorizing an establishment of "water communication" between the Delaware River and the Hudson River.  The D&H was chartered by separate laws in the states of New York and Pennsylvania in 1823 and 1826, respectively, allowing William Wurts and his brother Maurice to construct the Delaware and Hudson Canal and the gravity railroad that served it. In January 1825, following a demonstration of anthracite heating in a Wall Street coffeehouse, the D&H's public stock offering raised a million dollars. At the time, the Lehigh Canal had established a reliable flow of increasing annual tonnages, and the industrial and heating uses of 'rock coal' were well established.

Ground was broken on July 13, 1825, and the canal was opened to navigation in October 1828. It began at Rondout Creek at the location known as Creeklocks, between Kingston (where the creek fed into the Hudson River) and Rosendale. From there, it proceeded southwest alongside Rondout Creek to Ellenville, continuing through the valley of Sandburg Creek, Homowack Kill, Basha Kill, and Neversink River to Port Jervis on the Delaware River. From there, the canal ran northwest on the New York side of the Delaware River, crossing into Pennsylvania on Roebling's Delaware Aqueduct at Lackawaxen and running on the north bank of the Lackawaxen River to Honesdale.

To get the anthracite from the Wurts' mine in the Moosic Mountains near Carbondale to the canal at Honesdale, the canal company built the Delaware and Hudson Gravity Railroad. The state of Pennsylvania authorized its construction on April 8, 1826. On August 8, 1829, the D&H's first locomotive, the Stourbridge Lion, made history as the first locomotive to run on rails in the United States. Westward extensions of the railroad opened access to new mines at Archbald in 1843, Valley Junction in 1858, Providence in 1860, and Scranton in 1863. Passenger service began west of Carbondale in 1860.

The canal was a successful enterprise for many of its early years, but the company's management realized that railroads were the future of transportation, and began investing in stock and trackage. In 1898, the canal carried its last loads of coal and was drained and sold. The next year, the company dropped the "Canal" from its name. The remaining fragments of the canal were designated a National Historic Landmark in 1968.

Delaware and Hudson Company 

As railroads grew in popularity, the canal company recognized the importance of replacing the canal with a railroad. The first step of this was the Jefferson Railroad, a line from Carbondale north towards New York, chartered in 1864, built by the Erie Railroad in 1869 and opened in 1872. This was a branch of the Erie, running south from the main line at Lanesboro to Carbondale. Also built as part of this line was a continuation from the other side of the D&H's gravity railroad at Honesdale southeast to the Erie's Pennsylvania Coal Company railroad at Hawley. The Jefferson Railroad (and through it the Erie) obtained trackage rights over the D&H between its two sections, and the D&H obtained trackage rights to Lanesboro.

The other part of the main line was the Albany and Susquehanna Railroad, which the D&H leased on February 24, 1870. The Delaware and Hudson already had a history of working with the Albany and Susquehanna, agreeing in 1866 to jointly build an extension to Nineveh and subsequently ship coal across the entire line. The two companies then entered into an arrangement whereby the Delaware and Hudson perpetually leased the Albany and Susquehanna for $490,000 per year. The connecting Lackawanna and Susquehanna Railroad, chartered in 1867 and opened in 1872, was also absorbed. The Albany and Susquehanna provided a line from Albany southwest to Binghamton, while the Lackawanna and Susquehanna split from that line at Nineveh, running south to the Jefferson Railroad at Lanesboro. Also leased in 1870 was the Schenectady and Susquehanna Railroad, connecting the Albany and Susquehanna at Duanesburg to Schenectady, opened in 1872 (reorganized as the Schenectady and Duanesburg Railroad in 1873).

On March 1, 1871, the D&H leased the Rensselaer and Saratoga Railroad Company, which, along with its leased lines, provided a network stretching north from Albany and Schenectady to Saratoga Springs, and continuing northeast to Rutland, Vermont, as well as an eastern route to Rutland via trackage rights over the Troy and Boston Railroad west of Eagle Bridge. The D&H also obtained a quarter interest in the Troy Union Railroad from this lease.

On March 1, 1873, the D&H got the New York and Canada Railroad chartered as a merger of the Whitehall and Plattsburgh Railroad and Montreal and Plattsburg Railroad, which had been owned by the Rutland Railroad. This provided an extension, completed in 1875, north from Whitehall to the border with Quebec; a branch opened in 1876 to Rouses Point. Lines of the Grand Trunk Railway continued each of the two branches north to Montreal.

The D&H obtained trackage rights over the Lehigh and Susquehanna Railroad in 1886, extending the main line southwest from Scranton to Wilkes-Barre.

On July 11, 1889, the D&H bought the Adirondack Railway, a long branch line heading north from Saratoga Springs along the Hudson River.

Some company directors questioned the wisdom of acquiring extensive rail systems in northern New York. A direct line to Albany existed for many years through the canal and river system, so most of the coal markets in the area were already accessible. These concerns were overruled by the majority, who believed  great benefit would accrue to having an all-rail route to Upstate New York that was not nearly as vulnerable to winter weather as the canal. Avoiding situations in which the company would have to rely on other railroads to reach its markets also would be desirable. The effort was helped by a report that estimated necessary upgrades to the canal would cost $300,000, an expenditure that would not be needed if rail routes could be purchased or leased.

The canal was last used on November 5, 1891, and the gravity railroad closed January 3, 1899. On April 28, 1899, the name was changed to the Delaware and Hudson Company to reflect the lack of a canal, which was sold in June of that year. Between Port Jackson and Ellenville, the right-of-way for the canal was used by the Ellenville and Kingston Railroad, a branch of the New York, Ontario and Western Railway, chartered in 1901 and opened in 1902.

In 1903, the D&H organized the Chateaugay and Lake Placid Railway as a consolidation of the Chateaugay Railroad, Chateaugay Railway, and Saranac and Lake Placid Railway. In conjunction with the Plattsburgh and Dannemora Railroad, which had been leased by the Chateaugay Railroad, this formed a long branch from Plattsburgh west and south to Lake Placid.

In 1906, the D&H bought the Quebec Southern Railway and South Shore Railway, merging them into the Quebec, Montreal and Southern Railway. This line ran from St. Lambert, a suburb of Montreal, northeast to Fortierville, most of the way to Quebec City. The D&H sold that line to the Canadian National Railway in 1929.

The D&H incorporated the Napierville Junction Railway in 1906 to continue the line north from Rouses Point to St. Constant Junction near Montreal, Quebec, from which the D&H obtained trackage rights over the Grand Trunk Railway to Montreal. This line opened in 1907, forming part of the shortest route between New York City and Montreal.

In 1912, the D&H and the Pennsylvania Railroad incorporated the Wilkes-Barre Connecting Railroad, creating an interchange between the two lines at Hanover Township, Pennsylvania, thus avoiding going through downtown Wilkes-Barre. Opened in 1915, this line runs north 6.65 miles to the D&H main line at Hudson, crossing the Susquehanna River twice.

On April 1, 1930, the property of the Delaware and Hudson Company was transferred to the Delaware and Hudson Railroad Corporation, incorporated December 1, 1928. In 1938, the D&H started to act as a bridge line, carrying large amounts of freight between other connecting lines.

After the Second World War the D&H, like all railroads in the United States, gradually curtailed passenger service. By 1957, the D&H had ended service between Albany and Lake George (via Fort Edward) and between Albany and North Creek (via Saratoga Springs) in the southeast part of Adirondack Park. The D&H had also ended service on its branch between Plattsburgh and Lyon Mountain during this period. By 1960, service consisted of the following trains: the daytime Laurentian and overnight Montreal Limited between New York City and Montreal, unnamed local trains between Albany and Rouses Point and Albany and Binghamton, and a commuter train between Albany and Saratoga Springs. The D&H discontinued the Rouses Point locals in July 1960, the Albany–Saratoga commuter train in late 1962, and the Binghamton train on January 24, 1963. The Laurentian and Montreal Limited remained in operation through the 1960s until April 30, 1971, when Amtrak thereafter assumed most long-distance passenger-train service. Amtrak introduced the daytime Adirondack over the D&H line on August 6, 1974.

Delaware and Hudson Railway (1968–1988)

In 1964, Norfolk & Western wanted the Wabash & Nickel Plate Roads. The ICC at the time informed them that to get those two roads, they would also have to take the Erie Lackawanna & D&H. The D&H company was reorganized as the Delaware and Hudson Railway, and both roads were placed into Dereco, a holding company owned by Norfolk and Western Railway. After New York and Pennsylvania were hit by Hurricane Agnes in 1972, which destroyed part of the EL main line west of Binghamton, and following the bankruptcy of numerous northeastern U.S. railroads in the 1970s, including D&H and E-L, N&W lost control of Dereco stock. After several merger plans fell through, EL petitioned for and was included in the formation of the federal government's nascent Consolidated Rail Corporation (Conrail). While D&H was technically still owned by N&W, they were given financial support and told to "sink or swim" as an independent railroad again. In 1980, Conrail sold the former DL&W main line from Binghamton to Scranton to the D&H; being a flatter, more direct route to Scranton, this acquisition allowed the D&H to abandon its famed Penn Division between Carbondale and the connection with the ex-Erie/EL at Jefferson Junction.  The D&H was left out of Conrail  to maintain a semblance of competition in the Northeast.  While the success of this move has often been discredited, since the D&H was simply too small to compete with all of the markets served by Conrail, in fact the railroad doubled in size by being granted trackage rights over Conrail reaching Newark, Philadelphia, Buffalo, and Washington, DC. The remainder of the Penn Division from Lanesboro, Pennsylvania, to Nineveh, New York, was abandoned after the Belden Hill tunnel was enlarged in 1986.

In 1984, Guilford Transportation Industries purchased the D&H as part of a plan to operate a larger regional railroad from Maine and New Brunswick in the east, to New York City and the Midwest in the west, Montreal in the north, and the Philadelphia/Washington, DC, area in the south. For only $500,000, Guilford purchased the entire railroad. The price tag reflected the D&H's horrid financial shape and the poor condition of its physical plant. At the time of the purchase, the D&H had little freight traffic, relying on federal and state money to keep operating. Guilford's plans for expanded service did not come to fruition, and in 1988, after two intense labor strikes, Guilford declared the D&H bankrupt, abandoning its operation. Lackawanna County, Pennsylvania, purchased the line south of Carbondale to Scranton and currently serves a growing number of industries in the valley under the auspices of the designated operator Delaware Lackawanna Railroad.

With the D&H in limbo, the federal government ordered the New York, Susquehanna & Western Railway to operate the D&H without subsidy until such time as a buyer could be found. Guilford claimed that the D&H had assets of $70M at the time of the bankruptcy.

Canadian Pacific era (1991–present)

In 1991, the Canadian Pacific Railway (CPR) purchased the D&H for $25M to give the CPR's transcontinental system a connection between Montreal and the New York City metropolitan area.

CPR assumed all operations of the D&H system and eventually phased out the use of the D&H name and logos on locomotives or rolling stock. Under CPR, the D&H trackage was upgraded and  excess track was removed. Although successful for a short time, the D&H was soon in limbo again, and in 1996, CPR placed it and other money-losing trackage in the eastern U.S. and Canada into a separate operating company named St. Lawrence and Hudson Railway. In 2000, the St.L&H was merged back into CPR.

The D&H has had trouble making money for some time. As described above, it was originally constructed as a coal-hauling route, and when that business declined,  turning a profit proved difficult. The D&H operates in some of the most rural areas of New York, and very few industrial customers between Binghamton and Rouses Point remain. The railroad's current prognosis is arguably better than it has been in a long time. Along with the New York City connection, haulage agreements with other railroads are greatly increasing traffic. CPR has been steadily using their high-power alternating current traction locomotives on their road trains on the D&H line, instead of their aging SD40-2 models. This is an indication of the increasing importance of reliable service. Also, major signal and track projects are underway to modernize the former D&H lines.

As of 2012, various trackage and haulage rights have been assigned to Norfolk Southern Railway (NS) over the D&H between Sunbury and Mechanicville, New York, and a connection to Canadian National via Rouse Point, New York.  NS has incorporated the former bridge-line route into their "Patriot Corridor", and currently the majority of the traffic on the D&H is that of the NS.

In 2017, CPR finished installing an updated signaling system on the line. In 2018, CPR started doing extensive work on the line, possibly in preparation for increased traffic.

Partial purchase by Norfolk Southern
In October 2014, Canadian Pacific's Delaware & Hudson put a portion of their lines south of CP's Mohawk Yard in Glenville, New York, to Sunbury, Pennsylvania, and the former Albany Main from Delanson, New York, to Voorheesville, New York, up for sale. Voorheesville Track is operated under contract by SMS Rail Services. Under the purchase agreement, CPR D&H would retain the lines from Mechanicville, New York, to Mohawk Yard and Rouses Point, New York, to Albany, to retain lucrative Bakken crude-oil traffic. The majority of the current traffic on the offered routes already consisted of NS Intermodal Containers and Auto Rack trains bound for Ayer, Massachusetts, via Pan Am Southern. On November 17, 2014, NS acquired the Schenectady, New York, to Sunbury, Pennsylvania, and Delanson to Voorheesville, New York, segments for $217 million. On September 19, 2015, NS assumed ownership and operations of their newly purchased portion of the old D&H mainline.

Legacy

 
The Delaware and Hudson was one of (if not the) longest-operating class I railroads in American history. While in independent operation, the railroad was well managed. In the 1930s, during the Great Depression, D&H President L.F. Loree ordered many of the railway's larger locomotives to be taken off the main line and serviced with the sole reasoning being to keep men working so they did not lose their jobs. Most of these engines were in excellent condition and did not need repairs. Also in 1939, the railroad experimented with welded rail before many other railroads.

The branch of the D&H that ran between Lake George and Glens Falls, New York, was converted to the Warren County Bikeway in several phases, starting in 1978 and finishing in 2000.

Amtrak's Adirondack and Ethan Allen Express trains also operate over former D&H trackage.

The Lyon Mountain Railroad Station at Lyon Mountain, New York, was listed on the National Register of Historic Places in 2002 and the Mediterranean Revival style Delaware and Hudson Passenger Station (1909–1911) at Lake George, New York, was listed in 2013.

The city of Delson, Quebec, was named in honor of the D&H, which runs through the town. The origin of the name Delson comes from a contraction of "DELaware and HudSON".

The Village of Delanson, New York, through which the D&H's Susquehanna Division ran, was also named in honor of the D&H. The name was coined by D&H Supt. C.D. Hammond around 1890 from the railroad's name DELaware ANd hudSON.

Subsidiaries and branches
 Napierville Junction Railway
 Greenwich and Johnsonville Railway

 Baltimore Coal & Union Railroad
 Northern Coal & Iron Company
 Plymouth & Wilkes-Barre Railroad and Bridge

Locomotives
The Delaware and Hudson locomotive roster was particularly unique in having models from Alco, GE, EMD, and Baldwin. The Delaware and Hudson also served Alco's main plant at Schenectady, NY making it a popular road to spot Alco locomotives in operation.

Company officers 

 Philip Hone: 1825-1826
 John Bolton: 1826-1831
 John Wurts: 1831-1854
 George Talbot Olyphant: 1858-1869
 Thomas Dickson: 1869-1884
 Robert M. Olyphant: 1884-1903
 David Wilcox: 1903-1907
 Leonor F. Loree: 1907-1938
 Thomas L. Hunter: 1938-1941
 Joseph Nuelle: 1941-1954
 William White: 1954-1967
 John P. Hiltz Jr.: 1967
 Frederick C. Dumaine Jr.: 1967-1968
 Frank W. McCabe: 1968
 John P. Fishwick: 1969-1970
 Gregory W. Maxwell: 1970-1972
 Carl B. Sterzing Jr.: 1972-1977
 Selig Altschul: 1977
 Charles E. Bertrand: 1977-1978
 Kent Shoemaker: 1978-1982
 Timothy Mellon: 1984-1988 (Guilford Transportation Industries ownership)
 Walter Rich: 1988-1991 (Federally Designated Operator: Delaware Otsego Corp/NYS&W)
 Robert J. Ritchie: 1991-2006 (Canadian Pacific Ownership)
 Fred Green: 2006-2012 (CP)
 Stephen C. Tobias: (Interim) 2012 (CP)
 E. Hunter Harrison: 2012–2017 (CP)
 Keith Creel: 2017-Today (CP)

See also

 Batten Kill Railroad
 SUNY Plaza
 Delson, Québec
Delaware and Hudson Rail Trail
Lacolle railway station
 Delaware Canal - A sister canal from the mouth of the Lehigh River and canal terminus, feeding urban Philadelphia connecting with the Morris and Lehigh Canals at their respective Easton terminals.
 Delaware and Raritan Canal – A New Jersey canal connection to the New York & New Jersey markets shipping primarily coal across the Delaware River. The D&R also shipped Iron Ore from New Jersey up the Lehigh.
 Chesapeake and Delaware Canal – A canal crossing the Delmarva Peninsula in the states of Delaware and Maryland, connecting the Chesapeake Bay with the Delaware Bay.
 Delaware and Hudson Canal - Another early built coal canal as the American canal age began; contemporary with the Lehigh and the Schuylkill navigations.
 Lehigh Canal – the coal canal along the Lehigh Valley that fed the United States early Industrial revolution energy needs directly and via the Delaware Canal businesses all along the forty miles to Philadelphia from Easton, Pennsylvania.
 Pennsylvania Canal System - ambitious collection of far flung canals, and eventually railroads authorized early in 1826.
 Schuylkill Canal - Navigation joining Reading, PA and Philadelphia.

Notes

Footnotes

References

Further reading
 L. Lowenthal, From the Coalfields to the Hudson: A History of the Delaware & Hudson Canal, Purple Mountain Press, 2009.
 T. Starr, Golden Age of Railroads in New York's Capital District, Timothy Starr, 2012.

External links

D&H Historical Society

D&H Canal Historical Society
Carbondale Historical Society and D&H Transportation Museum
D&H 4-8-4s
D&H 4-6-6-4s
D&H Virtual Museum

 
Canadian Pacific Railway subsidiaries
Companies based in New York (state)
Defunct Maryland railroads
Defunct Vermont railroads
Defunct Virginia railroads
Defunct Washington, D.C., railroads
Former Class I railroads in the United States
Former regional railroads in the United States
History of Orange County, New York
History of Ulster County, New York
New Jersey railroads
New York (state) railroads
Pan Am Railways
Pennsylvania railroads
Predecessors of the Canadian Pacific Railway
Companies that filed for Chapter 11 bankruptcy in 1987
Railway companies established in 1968
Transportation in Sullivan County, New York
American companies established in 1899
Railway companies established in 1899
American companies established in 1968